Stephen A. Kelly, S.J. (December 26, 1833 – February 13, 1910) was an Irish-American Catholic priest and Jesuit.

Early life 
Stephen A. Kelly was born on December 26, 1833, in Dublin, in the United Kingdom of Great Britain and Ireland. He entered the Society of Jesus and proceeded to the Jesuit novitiate in Frederick, Maryland, US.

Academic career 

Kelly became a professor at Georgetown University and Gonzaga College in Washington, D.C. He then became the assistant superior of Woodstock College, before being appointed the President of Loyola College in Maryland and ex officio pastor of St. Ignatius Church in January 1871, succeeding Edward Henchy.

Later years 
In 1881, Kelly became the pastor of Holy Trinity Church in Washington, D.C. He died on February 13, 1910, at the rectory of Old St. Joseph's Church in Philadelphia, Pennsylvania.

References

Citations

Sources 

 
 

1833 births
1910 deaths
Christian clergy from Dublin (city)
19th-century Irish Jesuits
20th-century Irish Jesuits
19th-century American Jesuits
20th-century American Jesuits
Presidents of Loyola University Maryland
Pastors of Holy Trinity Catholic Church (Washington, D.C.)
Pastors of St. Ignatius Church (Baltimore)